Bob Macoritti (born September 19, 1950) is a retired Canadian football player who played for the Winnipeg Blue Bombers and Saskatchewan Roughriders of the Canadian Football League (CFL). He played college football at Wooster College.

References

1948 births
Living people
American football placekickers
Canadian football placekickers
Wooster Fighting Scots football players
Winnipeg Blue Bombers players
Saskatchewan Roughriders players